BVS may stand for:

 Bachelor of Veterinary Science, a degree
 Batman v Superman: Dawn of Justice
 Biblioteca Virtual en Salud ("Virtual Health Library" in Spanish)
 Business Valuation Standards
 FAA location identifier for Skagit Regional Airport
 Reporting mark for Bevier and Southern Railroad